Stoke Park was a country estate located to the South West of Ipswich. It is now a residential area and gave its name to Stoke Park ward located in the South West Area of Ipswich, in the English county of Suffolk.

References 

Ipswich Districts